Insara elegans, the elegant bush katydid, is a species of phaneropterine katydid in the family Tettigoniidae. It is found in North America.

Subspecies
 Insara elegans consuetipes (Scudder, 1900)
 Insara elegans elegans (Scudder, 1901)

References

 Capinera J.L, Scott R.D., Walker T.J. (2004). Field Guide to Grasshoppers, Katydids, and Crickets of the United States. Cornell University Press.
 Otte, Daniel (1997). "Tettigonioidea". Orthoptera Species File 7, 373.

Further reading

External links

 NCBI Taxonomy Browser, Insara elegans

Phaneropterinae
Insects described in 1901